The 2004 Race of Champions took place on December 4 at the Stade de France in Saint-Denis. Unlike previous events at a gravel course in Gran Canaria, the new Stade de France event was all-tarmac, so road racers became more competitive than rally drivers.

The Nations' Cup underwent some significant changes - nations were now represented by only two competitors instead of three, with the motorcyclists axed. In addition, the rules regarding having one rally driver and one circuit driver were relaxed, leading to some all-circuit driver teams. As the host nation, France was permitted to field two teams.

The individual event was won by a then-relatively unknown Heikki Kovalainen, and the team event by Jean Alesi and Sébastien Loeb representing France. There was also a special "World Champions Challenge" race held between 2004 Formula One world champion Michael Schumacher and 2004 world rally champion Sébastien Loeb, which Schumacher won.

Participants

* - Casey Mears was a last-minute substitute for Jeff Gordon, who was hospitalized with the flu and told not to participate in this event by doctors while at NASCAR's awards banquet in New York City that week.

Race of Champions

Racing Group

Rallying Group

Final

World Champions Challenge

The Nations Cup

Quarterfinals

Semifinals

Final

References

External links
 History 2004

Race of Champions
Race of Champions
Race of Champions
International sports competitions hosted by France